Wrigley may refer to:

 Wrigley Company, a chewing gum manufacturer owned by Mars, Incorporated
 EG Wrigley and Company, a British manufacturer of cars, car components and mechanical parts
 Wrigley (surname), a list of people with the name
 Wrigley, Northwest Territories, Canada
 Wrigley, Kentucky, United States
 Wrigley, Long Beach, California, a neighborhood

See also
 Wrigley Building, a skyscraper in Chicago
 Wrigley Field, a ballpark in Chicago
 Wrigley National Midget Tournament, Canadian ice-hockey tournament (1973-1978)